Battle of Sepphoris may refer to one of the following battles or sieges taking place near the village of Sepphoris:

Conquest of Sepphoris by Roman client king Herod the Great in 37 BCE, after it had been garrisoned by the Parthian proxy, the Hasmonean Antigonus II Mattathias
Destruction of Sepphoris (4 BCE), during first rebellion of Judas of Galilee
Destruction of Sepphoris (6), during second rebellion of Judas of Galilee
Siege of Sepphoris (66), during Gallus's campaign in the First Jewish–Roman War
Siege of Sepphoris (67), siege by Judean Free Government rebels against pro-Roman loyalists in the First Jewish–Roman War
Battle of Sepphoris (352) , when the city (Diocaesarea) was razed during the Jewish revolt against Constantius Gallus
Occupation of Sepphoris by Arab armies in 634